Wijngaarden is a village in the Dutch province of South Holland. It is a part of the municipality of Molenlanden, and lies about 7 km northeast of Dordrecht.

In 2001, the village of Wijngaarden had 300 inhabitants. The built-up area of the village was 0.030 km2, and contained 99 residences.
The statistical area "Wijngaarden", which also can include the peripheral parts of the village, as well as the surrounding countryside, has a population of around 730.

Wijngaarden was a separate municipality between 1817 and 1986, when it became part of Graafstroom., which in turn became part of Molenwaard in 2013.

Economy
Wijngaarden's economy has seen substantial growth in the public sector during 2009, 2010 and 2011.

References

Former municipalities of South Holland
Populated places in South Holland
Molenlanden